Rayachoti is one of the 175 constituencies of the Andhra Pradesh Legislative Assembly in Andhra Pradesh, India. It is one of 6 constituencies in Annamayya district.

Gadikota Srikanth Reddy  of Yuvajana Sramika Rythu Congress Party is its current representative.

Mandals 
The constituency is formed with Six Mandals.

Members of Legislative Assembly Rayachoti

Election results

Assembly elections 1952

2019

See also
 List of constituencies of the Andhra Pradesh Legislative Assembly
 Kadapa district

References

External links 
 Election Commission of India results page (1978 –)

Assembly constituencies of Andhra Pradesh
Kadapa district